While many hospitals in Australia have  the capability to treat burns, there are currently 13 designated burns units across Australia. Most states have one centre for adults and another for children; all units are located in a state/territorial capital city.

Australian Capital Territory
The ACT (Canberra) currently has no designated burns unit; patients with severe burns are usually transferred to Concord Repatriation General Hospital or The Children’s Hospital at Westmead in New South Wales.

New South Wales
 Concord Repatriation General Hospital
 Royal North Shore Hospital, St Leonards
 The Children’s Hospital at Westmead

Northern Territory
 Royal Darwin Hospital
Patients with severe burns are also transferred to Royal Adelaide Hospital or Women's and Children's Hospital in South Australia.

Queensland
 Royal Brisbane Hospital
 Queensland Children's Hospital, South Brisbane (since the closure of the Royal Children's Hospital, Herston)

South Australia
 Royal Adelaide Hospital
 Women's and Children's Hospital, North Adelaide

Victoria
 The Alfred, Melbourne
 Royal Children's Hospital, Melbourne

Tasmania
 Royal Hobart Hospital

Western Australia
 Fiona Stanley Hospital, Murdoch
 Perth Children's Hospital, Nedlands

References

Burn centres
Burns